Pat McQuillan (born 27 June 1961) is a Northern Irish former footballer who played in the Football League for Swansea City.

McQuillan made his Football League debut for Swansea in a  Division Two match on 31 December 1983 in a victory over Derby County.

References

1961 births
Living people
Association football defenders
Swansea City A.F.C. players
English Football League players
Pembroke Borough A.F.C. players
Association footballers from Belfast
Association footballers from Northern Ireland